The house at 318–332 Marquette Street  is a historic building located in the West End of Davenport, Iowa, United States. The multiple-dwelling residential building was built by Lorenz Wahl who operated a grocery store. It has eight units, which housed mainly short term tenants over the years. The building is a 1½ story, side gable structure with small windows below the eaves. The units are symmetrically arraigned with a door on the front and two windows to the side. While rare today, it was a common housing option in the years before and after the American Civil War when poor immigrants and laborers were moving into the city and created a housing shortage. It has been listed on the National Register of Historic Places since 1983.

References

Houses completed in 1870
Vernacular architecture in Iowa
Apartment buildings in Davenport, Iowa
Apartment buildings on the National Register of Historic Places in Iowa
National Register of Historic Places in Davenport, Iowa